The House of Smiles is a 1991 Italian film directed by Marco Ferreri. It depicts a romance between an old man and an old woman inside a care home.

The film won the Golden Bear at the 41st Berlin International Film Festival.

Cast
 Ingrid Thulin as Adelina
 Dado Ruspoli as Andrea
 Enzo Cannavale as Avvocato
 María Mercader as Elvira
 Lucia Vasini as Giovanna
 Francesca Antonelli as Rosy
 Elisabeth Kaza as Esmeralda
 Nunzia Fumo
 Fulvio Falzarano

References

External links 
 
 

1991 films
1991 drama films
Italian drama films
1990s Italian-language films
Films directed by Marco Ferreri
Golden Bear winners
1990s Italian films